Fedi Ben Choug (born 12 March 1995) is a Tunisian footballer who plays as a midfielder for Moroccan club Hassania Agadir.

Career 
On 30 July 2015, Ben Choug signed for Tunisian club CS Sfaxien on a four-year contract. On 28 June 2019, he moved to ES Tunis on a free transfer for three seasons, after his contract with Bizertin had expired.

Career statistics

Club

Notes

References

1995 births
Living people
French footballers
French sportspeople of Tunisian descent
Association football midfielders
Paris FC players
FCM Aubervilliers players
CS Sfaxien players
Stade Tunisien players
CA Bizertin players
Espérance Sportive de Tunis players
Hassania Agadir players
Championnat National 3 players
Championnat National 2 players
Tunisian Ligue Professionnelle 1 players
Botola players